"Something Good" is a song by English indie rock quartet alt-J from their debut studio album An Awesome Wave (2012). The song was released on 28 September 2012 as the album's fourth single. The song was written by Joe Newman, Gus Unger-Hamilton, Gwilym Sainsbury, Thom Green and produced by Charlie Andrew.

The song was featured in the 2013 version of BBC Two's "Tent Explorer" ident. It was also featured in the 2015 video game Life Is Strange.

Music video
A music video to accompany the release of "Something Good" was first released on YouTube on 18 September 2012 at a total length of three minutes and forty-two seconds. The video was shot in Los Angeles, CA by Brewer, a directing duo by brothers Alex and Ben Brewer and has earned them the 2013 Young Director Award for Non-European Music Video.

Track listing

Credits and personnel
Lead vocals – Alt-J (∆)
Producers – Charlie Andrew
Lyrics – Joe Newman, Gus Unger-Hamilton, Gwilym Sainsbury, Thom Green

Chart performance

Certifications

Release history

References

2012 singles
Alt-J songs
2012 songs
Songs written by Thom Sonny Green